Tekstilshchiki District is a district of South-Eastern Administrative Okrug of the federal city of Moscow, Russia. Population:

References

External links

Districts of Moscow
South-Eastern Administrative Okrug